Mick Gilmore is a former Australian rules footballer, who played for the Fitzroy Football Club in the Victorian Football League (VFL).

Career
Gilmore played two games for Fitzroy in the 1980 season, scoring one goal.

References

External links

Fitzroy Football Club players
1961 births
Living people
Australian rules footballers from Victoria (Australia)